Lace fern is a common name for several plants and may refer to:

Asparagus setaceus, a native fern species of Southern Africa
Leptolepia novae-zelandiae, a New Zealand native fern species